Texas Longhorns baseball represents the University of Texas in college baseball at the NCAA Division I level.

1897

The 1897 Texas Longhorns baseball team represented the Texas Longhorns baseball program for the University of Texas in the 1897 college baseball season.  F. Weikart coached the team in his 1st season at Texas.

Schedule

1898

The 1898 Texas Longhorns baseball team represented the Texas Longhorns baseball program for the University of Texas in the 1898 college baseball season.  A. C. Ellis coached the team in his 1st season at Texas.

Schedule

1899

The 1899 Texas Longhorns baseball team represented the Texas Longhorns baseball team of the University of Texas in the 1899 college baseball season.  A. C. Ellis led his second and final season as coach.

Personnel

Players

Staff

Schedule and results

References

1895-1899